Steven Lee Anderson (born July 24, 1981) is an American preacher and founder of the New Independent Fundamentalist Baptist movement. He is pastor of Faithful Word Baptist Church in Tempe, Arizona. He advocates for the death penalty for homosexuals, and prayed for the deaths of former U.S. president Barack Obama and Caitlyn Jenner.

He has been banned from many countries, including The Netherlands, South Africa, United Kingdom, Botswana, Canada, Jamaica, the Schengen Area, Ireland, Australia, and New Zealand.

Early life
Anderson was born in Sacramento, California to an Independent Baptist family, and he attended Woodcreek High School, in Roseville.

Faithful Word Baptist Church

Anderson established Faithful Word Baptist Church as a fundamentalist Independent Baptist church in Tempe, Arizona, on Christmas Day in December 2005 and he remains its pastor. The church describes itself as "an old-fashioned, independent, fundamental, King James Bible–only, soul-winning Baptist church." Members of the church meet in an office space that is located inside a strip mall.

The group is nondenominational. Anderson has used his influence to found the New Independent Fundamentalist Baptist movement, which includes other churches.

The church has been described as an anti-gay hate group by the Southern Poverty Law Center, because Anderson has advocated the death penalty for homosexuals.

Views

Anti-government views 
The Southern Poverty Law Center describes him as a proponent of anti-government views. Anderson operates a website titled True Sons of Liberty where he recommends elimination of the Internal Revenue Service, the Federal Reserve Bank, the Social Security Administration, and child protective services. He has appeared on InfoWars on numerous occasions, and the InfoWars store used to offer for sale video productions by Anderson.

Allegations of antisemitism 
The Anti-Defamation League cited Anderson of "a history of antisemitism through his sermons and a series of YouTube videos." Emory University PhD candidate Matthew Brittingham suggested that Anderson is part of a connected but "diffuse group of theologically-focused, antisemitic Christian conspiracists who deny the Holocaust." In March 2015, Anderson released a documentary titled Marching to Zion, in which he argued that the anticipated Jewish messiah is the Antichrist and that the Talmud is blasphemous. Pastor and conspiracy theorist Texe Marrs appears in the documentary. In May 2015, he posted a YouTube video, titled The Holocaust Hoax Exposed, promoting Holocaust denial.

Why I Hate Barack Obama sermon 
The church received national attention in the United States in August 2009, when Anderson was reported to have delivered a sermon—entitled Why I Hate Barack Obama—in which he said he prayed for the death of the president.

Anderson did not solicit the killing of President Obama but he did suggest that the country would "benefit" from his death. Anderson told local television station KNXV-TV that he would like it if Obama were to die of natural causes because he does not "want him to be a martyr" and "we don't need another holiday." He told columnist Michelangelo Signorile that he "would not judge or condemn" anyone who killed the president.

Anderson's invective against Obama stems in part from his opposition to Obama's support for abortion rights. Anderson was then the recipient of death threats while a group, People Against Clergy Who Preach Hate, organized a "love rally" which was attended by approximately one hundred people outside the church.

The day after Anderson delivered his Why I Hate Barack Obama sermon, a church member, Chris Broughton, carried an AR-15 semiautomatic rifle and a pistol to the Phoenix Convention Center, where President Obama was speaking. Broughton explained that he was not motivated by the sermon although he agreed with it. Broughton's appearance at the rally was part of a publicity stunt that was organized by conservative radio talk show host Ernest Hancock, who also came to the rally armed, and engaged in a staged interview with Broughton which was later broadcast on YouTube. Anderson told ABC News affiliate KNXV-TV in Phoenix that the Secret Service contacted him after this event.

Border Patrol checkpoint incident 
In 2009, Anderson had a confrontation with United States Border Patrol agents at an interior checkpoint on Interstate 8, about 70 miles (110 km) east of Yuma, Arizona. He refused to move his car or roll down his windows, triggering a 90-minute standoff and the calling of Arizona Department of Public Safety officers to the scene. The confrontation ended when authorities broke Anderson's car windows, tased him, and forced him out of the vehicle. Anderson said they beat him while he was lying prone on the ground.

At his arraignment in April 2009, Anderson pleaded not guilty to two misdemeanor counts of resisting a lawful order. He was acquitted of the two charges by a jury in August 2010.

Travel bans 
As of 2019, Anderson has been banned from more than 30 countries, including every English-speaking developed country other than the United States (his home country); and most English-speaking African countries. In September 2016, after he had announced his intention to travel to South Africa, Malusi Gigaba, the Minister for Home Affairs banned Anderson and his followers, citing the Constitution of South Africa and stating "I have identified Steven Anderson as an undesirable person to travel to South Africa".

Anderson was also banned from entering the United Kingdom, leading him to change his travel route to Botswana by flying via Ethiopia. On September 20, 2016, he was banned and deported from Botswana.

In a YouTube video, Anderson mentioned a planned missionary trip to Malawi to set up a church there. But Malawian authorities subsequently made it known that he would not be welcome in the country and that he would also be banned from entering it in the future.

Anderson was denied entry to Canada on November 10, 2017.

On January 29, 2018, Anderson was banned from entering Jamaica.

Anderson was scheduled to preach in Amsterdam, the Netherlands, on May 23, 2019. The Dutch government began looking into banning him from entering the Netherlands on April 24, leading to the factual ban from the Netherlands, and the rest of the European Union's Schengen area on May 1. According to the Dutch state secretary, there is "no space for discrimination or the encouragement of hate, intolerance or violence in a democratic rechtsstaat like ours".

The Republic of Ireland banned him on May 12, 2019. On July 23, 2019, Anderson was denied entry to Australia. On August 7, 2019, Anderson was denied entry to New Zealand.

Personal life
Anderson met his wife Zsuzsanna in Munich, Bavaria, by presenting her with the gospel. Prior to meeting Anderson, she had been raised as a Catholic but she had become an agnostic as a young adult. After converting Zsuzsanna to fundamentalist baptist Christianity, the couple married in 2000 and, as of November 2022, they have twelve children whom they homeschool.

Notes

References

Living people
Discrimination against LGBT people in the United States
Critics of Judaism
People from Sacramento, California
Christian fundamentalists
American Holocaust deniers
Christianity and antisemitism
Baptist ministers from the United States
1981 births
YouTubers from California